Hlawga may refer to:
 Hlawga National Park, a national park in Myanmar
 Hlawga Lake, a water reservoir in Yangon Division, Myanmar